Lucian Bratu (14 July 1924 – 9 May 1998) was a Romanian Jewish film director.  Bratu directed ten films between 1960 and 1985.

Filmography
Secretul cifrului (1959)
Tudor (1962)
Sărutul (1965) 
Un film cu o fată fermecătoare (1966)
Drum în penumbră (1972)
Orașul văzut de sus (1975)
Mireasa din tren (1979)
Angela merge mai departe (1981) 
Acordați circumstanțe atenuante? (1984)
Orele unsprezece (1985)

References

External links

 Cinemagia - Lucian Bratu

See also
 List of Romanian film and theatre directors
 List of Romanian films

1924 births
1998 deaths
Romanian film directors  
Film people from Bucharest
Romanian Jews